Leo (Latin for "lion") is the fifth sign of the zodiac. It corresponds to the constellation Leo and comes after Cancer and before Virgo. The traditional Western zodiac associates Leo with the period between about July 23 and August 23, and the sign spans the 120th to 150th degree of celestial longitude.

Leo is associated with fire, accompanied by Aries and Sagittarius, and its modality is fixed. The constellation Leo is associated with the mythological Nemean lion. The lion is a very important and prominent symbol in Greek mythology.

History

Egyptians worshipped the constellation, which they referred to as "Knem", because it was present during the flooding of the Nile River. This event signified plentiful harvests for the upcoming year, and the people interpreted it as a gift from the earth. Ruler of Egypt, Tutankhamun's gold throne features lion heads where the seat and front legs meet, as well as clawed feet at the end of each leg, symbolizing power and royalty.

See also

Astronomical symbols
Chinese zodiac
Circle of stars
Cusp (astrology)
Elements of the zodiac

References

Sources

  Longitude of Sun, apparent geocentric ecliptic of date, interpolated to find time of crossing 0°, 30°....

External links

 Warburg Institute Iconographic Database (over 300 medieval and early modern images of Leo) 

Western astrological signs
Mythological lions